Stráž nad Ohří is a municipality and village in Karlovy Vary District in the Karlovy Vary Region of the Czech Republic. It has about 600 inhabitants.

Administrative parts
Villages of Boč, Kamenec, Korunní, Malý Hrzín, Osvinov, Peklo, Smilov and Srní are administrative parts of Stráž nad Ohří.

References

Villages in Karlovy Vary District